Barbara Knowles Debs, Ph.D. (born in 1931) is an American art historian who was the president of Manhattanville College from 1975 to 1985. She was the president of the New-York Historical Society from 1989 to 1992. She serves on the board of directors of the Brooklyn Museum of Art, the Foreign Policy Association and the Geraldine Rockefeller Dodge Foundation.

Biography
Barbara Jean Knowles was born in 1931 to Stanley Freeman Knowles of Cranston, Rhode Island. In 1953 she was a Fulbright scholar to Italy. She studied art history in both Pisa and Rome, She then earned her Ph.D. from Harvard University.

On July 20, 1958 she married Richard A. Debs in Orleans, Massachusetts. They have a daughter, Elizabeth Anderson Debs.

By 1971 she was an assistant professor of art history at Manhattanville College. She was named president of the college in 1975 and she served until 1985. She was named president of the New-York Historical Society in 1989 and served until 1992. In 1995 she and her husband endowed the Richard and Barbara Debs Composer's Chair at Carnegie Hall.

She was awarded the Fulbright Lifetime Achievement Medal in 2002.

Publications
Sebastiano Del Piombo, the Venetian Works (1967)

References

Manhattanville College faculty
1931 births
Living people
Directors of museums in the United States
Women museum directors
New-York Historical Society
Harvard University alumni
American art historians
Women art historians
Vassar College alumni
Historians from New York (state)
American women historians
21st-century American women